Andrea Bianca Martin Manzano Reyes (born March 29, 1987), more popularly known by her screen name Andi Manzano, is a Filipino radio jockey, television host, and actress. Andi rose to fame as a discjockey at FM radio station Magic 89.9 as a co-host in the Good Times with Mo program with Mo Twister and Mojo Jojo. She is related to Edu and Luis Manzano as well as Gary Valenciano. She became an MTV VJ when she won an MTV VJ hunt in the Philippines. She was the courtside reporter for the FEU Tamaraws on Studio 23's coverage of UAAP Season 70. With a number of endorsements that came her way, she is currently still a DJ on Magic 89.9 teaming up with Riki Flores from 3-6pm on weekdays (except Friday). Manzano had also been a mainstay VJ on Party Pilipinas on GMA.

Early life and career 
She started her career in 2000 as a cast member of Ang TV 2.

Filmography

Film
Unofficially Yours (2012) - Played the ex-girlfriend of John Lloyd Cruz's character

Television
 All Out Sundays - GMA Network
 Sunday PinaSaya - GMA Network
 Wasak - Aksyon TV (now One PH)
 Sunday All Stars - GMA Network
 Party Pilipinas - GMA Network
 Q Tube - QTV (now GTV 27)
 Candies - QTV (now GTV 27)
 Ang TV 2 - ABS-CBN
 MTV Philippines - VJ
 UAAP Season 70 -  Studio 23 (now ABS-CBN Sports & Action) "Courtside reporter for FEU games"
 Good Times TV Show - Studio 23 (now ABS-CBN Sports & Action)
 ASAP Natin To - ABS-CBN 
 MYX - VJ

Radio
 Magic 89.9 DJ Magic Top 5@5 (3-6pm) Andi-9 and Riki Flo
 Magic 89.9 DJ The Mother Show (Every Fridays, 10 to 11am) Riki & Delamar

Trivia
She is the cousin of MYX VJ Turned Actor & Comedian Luis Manzano, and also her uncle actor & comedian Edu Manzano.
She is a former VJ of MTV PH (Formerly MTV Philippines), her cousin Luis is also a former VJ from the rival cable channel MYX Channel, a subsidiary of ABS-CBN Corp.
Andi is also a DJ & host of Magic 89.9 FM., her recent talk program, "The Mother Show" reunited together with DJ Riki Flo & now a recent newest member of Magic 89.9 family is Delamar who originally came from Monster Radio RX 93.1 FM was introduced to Magic station in 2018 up to present.

References

External links 
 MyPetChannel
 Andi Manzano Blog Site

1987 births
Living people
Filipino radio personalities
Participants in Philippine reality television series
Filipino people of Spanish descent
Star Magic
VJs (media personalities)